The Nathalia Herald was a newspaper published in Nathalia, Victoria, Australia.

History 
Nathalia's first newspaper, the Nathalia Herald and Picola, Narioka, and Moire Advertiser was initiated from Numurkah in 1884.  In 1890, Frederick Henry Furze, who had lived most of his life in the district bought the Herald.  At the beginning of summer 1899 a fire swept down Blake Street destroying plant and building, a fate every owner dreaded.  The Herald was in operation from 1884 until 1975.

Digitised 
The Nathalia Herald and Picola, Narioka, Kotupna and Moira Advertiser (Vic. : 1914 - 1918) has been digitised by the National Library of Australia.

See also 
 List of newspapers in Australia

References

External links
 

Defunct newspapers published in Victoria (Australia)